David E. Bowles (born August 30, 1944) is an American politician from Maine. Bowles, a Republican from Sanford, served four terms (1998–2006) in the Maine House of Representatives. He served two of those terms in leadership as Assistant Minority Leader (2003–2004) and as Minority Leader (2005–2006).

Bowles was born in Rochester, New York and settled in Sanford, Maine. He attended Washington and Lee University for one year and the University of Southern Maine for five years. He also served in the United States Marine Corps from 1964 to 1968.

References

1944 births
Living people
Politicians from Rochester, New York
People from Sanford, Maine
Maine Republicans
Minority leaders of the Maine House of Representatives
United States Marines
Washington and Lee University alumni
University of Southern Maine alumni